"Perfect World" is a song by US singer Marcella Detroit, released in March 1995 under London Records as the fourth and final single from her album Jewel. The song reached a meager #100 on the UK Singles Chart, and was Detroit's final release with the label.

Track listing 
CD Single 1
"Perfect World" (95 Radio Mix) — 3:59
"Perfect World" (Album Version) — 4:32
"Perfect World" (Youth's Vocal Session) — 5:59
"Perfect World" (Youth's Dub Session) — 5:59

CD Single 2 - Acoustic Sessions
"Perfect World" (Acoustic)
"I Believe" (Acoustic)
"I'm No Angel" (Acoustic)
"You Don't Tell Me Everything" (Acoustic)

Charts

References 

1995 singles
Marcella Detroit songs
Songs written by Marcella Detroit